You Drive Me Crazy is a 2018 South Korean television series starring Lee Yoo-young, Kim Seon-ho, Kim Sung-joo and Kwon Do-woon. It was aired on MBC from May 7–8, 2018.

Synopsis
Han Eun-sung and Kim Rae-wan have been friends for 8 (right) years but their relationship changes after they sleep together. The mini series follows their shift in dynamics and revisitations to their past regrets and feelings (that were put aside in the name of friendship).

Cast

Main
 Kim Seon-ho as Kim Rae-wan (27 years old)
An artist. He has been Eun-sung's best friend for 8 years.
 Lee Yoo-young as Han Eun-sung (27 years old)
A simultaneous translator of French.

Supporting
 Kim Sung-joo as Yoon Hee-nam (early 20s)
An indie blues artist.
 Kwon Do-woon as Moon Seo-jung (early 20s)
A part-timer at Rae-wan's favorite cafe.
 Ryu Hye-rin as Kang Ji-in (27 years old)
Eun-sung's friend. She is also a French interpreter. 
 Park Hyo-joo as Lee Hyun-ji (early 30s)
Rae-wan's superior, she is the CEO of Hongdae Cafe.
 Ahn Ji-hoon
 Ok Joo-ri
 Lee Hwi-hyang

Original soundtrack

You Drive Me Crazy soundtrack album written by music director Joo Hong-chul contains two singles and 28 score pieces from the series. It features vocal performances from Sung Joo.

Production
On March 2, 2018, MBC announced that Lee Yoo-young and Kim Seon-ho confirmed as the lead roles in a MBC one-act play to be broadcast in May. Directed by Hyun Sol-ip, it was their first time as main leads on a terrestrial channel.

The first script reading of the cast was held in March 2018 at MBC Broadcasting Station in Sangam-dong.

Viewership
In the table below,  represent the lowest ratings and  represent the highest ratings.

Notes

References

External links
  
 You Drive Me Crazy at MBC Global Media
 
 

MBC TV television dramas
2018 South Korean television series debuts
2018 South Korean television series endings
Korean-language television shows
South Korean romance television series
South Korean melodrama television series